Scott Savitt is a former foreign correspondent for The Los Angeles Times and United Press International in Beijing. His articles have been published in The Los Angeles Times, Washington Post, Wall Street Journal, New York Times, and many other publications.

He has been interviewed on NPR, BBC, ABC’s Nightline and the CBS News. He is the in-house Chinese-English translator for numerous human rights organizations. In 1994, he founded Beijing Scene, China’s first independent weekly newspaper. In 2003 he published China Now magazine.

He’s the founding editor of the award-winning Contexts magazine. He was a visiting scholar at Duke University and now lives with his family in Ann Arbor, Michigan.

Books 
Crashing the Party: An American Reporter in China (2016)

External links

References

Living people
American male  journalists
American expatriates in China
Year of birth missing (living people)